The Second voyage of Kerguelen was an expedition of the French Navy to the southern Indian Ocean conducted by the 64-gun ship of the line Roland, the 32-gun frigate Oiseau, and the corvette Dauphine, under Captain Kerguelen. The aims of the expedition were to confirm the findings of the First voyage of Kerguelen, returning the Kerguelen Islands and exploring what was thought to be a peninsula of a southern continent.

The expedition, prepared with better equipment but less suitable ships than the first, led to the recognition that Kerguelen's southern continent was actually a barren archipelago.

Upon his return, Kerguelen was court-martialed, and expelled from the Navy for having brought his mistress aboard his ship.

Conception

Voyage

Aftermath

See also

 First voyage of Kerguelen

Notes, citations, and references 
Notes

Citations

References
 
 
 
 

 
 
 
 

External links
 
 

1773 in France
1774 in transport
18th-century history of the French Navy
Expeditions from France
Exploration of the Indian Ocean
1770s in science